The 1932 Illinois Fighting Illini football team was an American football team that represented the University of Illinois during the 1932 Big Ten Conference football season.  In their 20th season under head coach Robert Zuppke, the Illini compiled a 5–4 record and finished in seventh place in the Big Ten Conference. Halfback Gil Berry was selected as the team's most valuable player. He was also the team captain.

Schedule

References

Illinois
Illinois Fighting Illini football seasons
Illinois Fighting Illini football